Mezzegra is a former comune (municipality) in the Province of Como in the Italian region Lombardy. Since 21 January 2014 it is part of the comune of Tremezzina.

Geography

Mezzegra borders the following municipalities: Grandola ed Uniti, Lenno, Tremezzo.

The Comune di Mezzegra will be united to Lenno, Ossuccio and Tremezzo to form a single municipality named Tremezzina: the new administration will be formalized after election of the mayor on 25 May 2014

History

On 28 April 1945 in Giulino, a frazione of Mezzegra, Benito Mussolini and his lover Claretta Petacci were executed by communist partisans.

Demographic history

References

External links

Cities and towns in Lombardy
Tremezzina